Lichfield was a rural district in the county of Staffordshire, England from 1894 to 1974.

It was enlarged in 1934 by gaining part of Staffordshire that had been administered since 1894 as part of Tamworth Rural District, which was otherwise in Warwickshire.

References

Districts of England created by the Local Government Act 1894
Districts of England abolished by the Local Government Act 1972
Rural districts of England
Lichfield District